The GEN H-4 is a Japanese helicopter under development by GEN Corporation of Nagano. The aircraft is intended to be supplied as a kit for amateur construction.

Design and development
It features two contra-rotating main rotors, a single-seat open cockpit without a windshield, four-wheeled landing gear and four twin-cylinder, air-cooled, two-stroke,  GEN 125-F engines to provide operational redundancy since the aircraft cannot autorotate in the event of a power failure.

The aircraft fuselage is a simple open frame with a seat mounted on it. The main rotors are both of fixed pitch design, with no articulation in any axis. Steering is accomplished by pivoting the rotor head on a gimbal using a control handle, in a similar manner to a weight shift hang glider. Climb and descent is controlled by increasing and decreasing the throttle. The aircraft lacks a tail rotor, as the coaxial, contra-rotating main rotors produce zero net torque. Yawing motion is produced and controlled by electronic gyroscopically-controlled differential electric braking of the main rotors.

The company indicated that it had suspended production plans by 2012 due to lack of dealers outside Japan and put the cost of a single H-4 at ¥7,500,000.00 (about US$80,887.59 in 2013). The company stated that it could build the aircraft economically only in lots of ten and at a discounted rate only in lots of one hundred. To facilitate future production, the company indicated that it was "looking for sponsors, investors and partners".

Variants
H-4
Initial model powered by four twin-cylinder, air-cooled, two-stroke,  GEN 125-F engines
H-4E
Electrically-powered model under development
H-4R
Remote-control model under development

Accidents
On 29 June 2000, the prototype H-4, registered JX0076, was on a test flight at the company plant in Matsumoto-City, Nagano. The pilot was hovering, when the H-4 was hit by a wind gust and contacted the building,  to the northwest and then impacted the ground. The pilot was injured and the airframe damaged.

Specifications (H-4)

References

External links

Official videos of H-4 test flying

2000s Japanese sport aircraft
2000s Japanese helicopters
Homebuilt aircraft
Four-engined piston helicopters
Coaxial rotor helicopters